Mauritian Creole or Morisien (formerly Morisyen)  is a French-based creole language spoken in Mauritius. English words are included in the standardized version of the language. In addition, the slaves and indentured servants from cultures in Africa and Asia left a diverse legacy of language in the country. The words spoken by these groups are also incorporated into contemporary Morisien. 

Mauritian Creole is the lingua franca of the Republic of Mauritius, which gained independence from the United Kingdom in 1968. Both English and French are used as alternatives to Mauritian Creole. English is spoken primarily for administration and educational purposes and French is used by the media and as a second language.

Mauritians tend to speak Mauritian Creole at home and French in the workplace. French and English are taught in schools. Though Mauritians are of numerous ethnic origins (including Indian, African, European, and Chinese) Mauritian Creole has gradually replaced the ancestral languages of most the population to become the primary home language of the country. Today, around 1.3 million people speak the language.

Classification 
Mauritian Creole is a French-based creole language that may be related to the Seychellois, Rodriguan, and Chagossian Creoles. Linguists disagree over the relationship, if any, of Mauritian Creole to other creole language examples in other parts of the world. Robert Chaudenson and Henri Wittmann hypothesize that Mauritian Creole is closely related to Réunion Creole. However, Philip Baker and Chris Corne, have argued that Réunionnais influence on Mauritian was minimal and that the two languages are no more similar to each other than they are to other French-based creoles.

History 

The Portuguese were the first Europeans to visit Mauritius, but they did not settle there. Only a small portion of Mauritian vocabulary derives from the Portuguese element in European maritime jargon (e.g., the Mediterranean Lingua Franca) or from enslaved Africans or Asians who came from areas in which Portuguese was used as a trade language (e.g., Angola and Mozambique). Similarly, the Dutch had a colony on Mauritius from 1638 — 1710, but ultimately evacuated to Réunion. A few runaway slaves remained, leaving no discernible impact on the Mauritian language. 

The French ultimately claimed Mauritius and first settled it from 1715 — 1721, building a plantation economy based on slave labour. People from West Africa, Southeast Africa, and Madagascar became 85% of the population by 1777, which lead to linguistic fragmentation. The size of the native French settler population on the island remained small and the enslaved population lacked formal education. The common language that developed was based on French, but a dialect that differed greatly from the language spoken by the slave owners. Mechanistically, this was similar to the genesis of creole languages in other parts of the world. The pidgin language used for daily communication by people from varying linguistic backgrounds eventually became the native language of children born in these communities. Eventually, this evolved into a creole language, with the complexity and completeness required for young children to use it as their mother tongue. Historical documents from as early as 1773 note the "creole language" that the slaves spoke.

The British took over Mauritius during the Napoleonic era, but few native English speakers ever settled there. Mauritian Creole had already been firmly entrenched and continued to be the language used after British occupation began.

The abolition of slavery in the 1830s made many Africans leave the plantations. Indentured workers from India were brought to replace the freed slaves. The widely variable linguistic background of these immigrants mirrored that of the African slaves before them; therefore, no native language was dominant enough to become the basis for a shared language. Though Indians soon became the majority population on the island, their own linguistic fragmentation, as well as their alienation from the English- and French-speaking plantation owners, led them to take up Mauritian Creole as their lingua franca.

The native English and French population have long enjoyed greater social status, in addition to dominating government, business, education, and the media; however, Mauritian Creole's popularity in most informal domains has persisted, with around 85% of the population speaking this language.

Phonology 

The phonology of Mauritian Creole is very similar to that of Standard French.

Orthography
 
The language has several published dictionaries, both monolingual and bilingual, written by authors such as Philip Baker (1987) and Arnaud Carpooran (2005, 2009, 2011). The number of publications is increasing steadily, however, the orthographies used in them are significantly different.

The Mauritian government began supporting an orthographic reform in 2011, with a system that generally follows French but eliminates silent letters and reduces the number of different ways in which the same sound can be written. It was codified in the Lortograf Kreol Morisien (2011) and used in the Gramer Kreol Morisien (2012) as well. The language became standard upon the publication of the second edition of the Diksioner Morisien.

Sample vocabulary

Numbers 
Examples shown are in Mauritian Creole and French only.

Personal pronouns
Examples shown are in English, Mauritian Creole and French.

Directions

Tamil loanwords

Lexicon 
Most words come from French but are not always used in the same way. For example, the French article le, la, les is often fused with the noun in Mauritian: French rat is Mauritian lera and French temps is Mauritian letan. The same is true for some adjectives and prepositions: French femme ("woman") and riz ("rice") are bonnfam (from bonne femme) and diri (from du riz) in Mauritian.  Some words have changed their meanings altogether: Mauritian gagn ("to get" or "to obtain") is derived from French gagner ("to win" or "to earn").

Other words come from either Portuguese or Spanish. The word ziromon meaning pumpkin is from Portuguese, originally from Tupi.

There are also several loanwords from the languages of the African Malagasy slaves, who contributed such words as Mauritian lapang from Malagasy ampango (rice stuck to the bottom of a pot), Mauritian lafus from Malagasy hafotsa (a kind of tree), and Mauritian zahtak from Malagasy antaka (a kind of plant).  In some cases, as with some of the nouns from French, the Mauritian word has fused with the French article le/la/les.

Words of East African origin include Mauritian makutu from Makua makhwatta (running sore), Mauritian matak from Swahili, and Makonde matako (buttock).

Recent loanwords tend to come from English, such as map instead of plan or carte in French (plan or kart in Mauritian Creole). English words used in Mauritian Creole retain their English spelling but should normally be written with inverted commas.

Chinese words in Mauritian Creole only number 2: these are min and malang.
Min means comes from Cantonese and means "noodle".
Malang means "dirty" or "poor".

Grammar
Nouns do not change in the according to grammatical number. Whether a noun is singular or plural can usually be determined only by context. However, the particle bann (from bande) is often placed before a plural. French un/une corresponds to Mauritian enn but its use has slightly different rules. Mauritian has an article (la), but it is placed after the noun. Compare French un rat, ce rat, le rat, les rats, and Mauritian enn lera, lera-la and bann lera.

In Mauritian, there is only one form for each plural pronoun and the third-person singular pronoun, regardless of case or gender; li can thus be translated as "he, she, it, him, his, her, hers" depending on the context.

Verbs do not change their form according to tense or person. Instead, the accompanying noun or pronoun determines who is engaging in the action, and several preverbal particles are used alone or in combination to indicate the tense: ti (from French étais) marks past tense, pe, short for the now-rare ape (from "après," as Québec French) still uses to mark the progressive aspect, (f)inn (from French fini) marks the completive or perfect, and pou or sometimes va or av (from French va) marks the future tense.

For example, li finn gagn ("he/she/it had") can also be shortened to linn gagn and pronounced as one word. The Réunion version is li té fine gagne for past, li té i gagne for past progressive, and li sava gagne for present progressive or near future.

Sample
Here is the Lord's Prayer in Mauritian Creole, French and English:

See also 

 Creole language
 Agalega creole
 Chagossian creole
 Rodriguan creole
 Seychellois Creole

References

Bibliography

 Adone, Dany.  The Acquisition of Mauritian creole.  Amsterdam; Philadelphia:  J. Benjamins, 1984.
 Anonymous.  Diksyoner Kreol-Angle / Prototype Mauritian creole-English Dictionary.  Port Louis:  L.P.T., 1985.
 Baker, Philip and Chris Corne, Isle de France Creole: Affinities and Origins.  Ann Arbor:  Karoma, 1982.
 Baker, Philip and Vinesh Y. Hookoomsing.  Morisyen-English-français : diksyoner kreol morisyen (Dictionary of Mauritian creole).  Paris : Harmattan, 1987.
 Carpooran, Arnaud. Diksioner morisien [version prototip/let A–E].  Quatre Bornes, Ile Maurice : Editions Bartholdi, 2005.
 Carpooran, Arnaud. Le Créole Mauricien de poche.  Chennevières-sur-Marne : Assimil, 2007.  .
 Carpooran, Arnaud. Diksioner morisien[version integral/1e edision].  Sainte Croix, Ile Maurice : Koleksion Text Kreol, 2009, 1017pp.
 Carpooran, Arnaud. Diksioner morisien.  [version integral/2em edision]. Vacoas, Ile Maurice : Edition Le Printempss, 2011, 1200pp.
 Chaudenson, Robert.  Les créoles francais.  Évreux: F. Nathan, 1979.
 Chaudenson, Robert. Creolization of language and culture; translated and revised by Salikoko S. Mufwene, with Sheri Pargman, Sabrina Billings, and Michelle AuCoin.  London ; New York : Routledge, 2001. 
 Choy, Paul. Korek – A Beginners Guide To Mauritian Creole (Grand Baie, Mauritius: Pachworks 4th ed., 2014)
 Corne, Chris. Essai de grammaire du créole mauricien, Auckland : Linguistic Society of New Zealand, 1970.
 Corne, Chris. A contrastive analysis of Reunion and Isle de France Creole French: two typologically diverse languages. In: Isle de France Creole: affinities and origins, Philip Baker & Chris Corne, 8–129. Ann Arbor: Karoma, 1982. 
 Corne, Chris. "Mauritian creole Reflexives", Journal of Pidgin and Creole Languages, Volume 3, Number 1, 1988, pp. 69–94, 1988. 
 Corne, Chris. From French to Creole, Battlebridge Publications (Westminster Creolistics), 1999.
 Frew, Mark.  Mauritian creole in seven easy lessons. 2nd ed. Port Louis, Republic of Mauritius : Ledikasyon pu Travayer, 2003.
 Holm, John.  Pidgins and Creoles, Volume II: Reference Survey.  Cambridge:  Cambridge University Press, 1989.
 Lee, Jacques K. Mauritius : its Creole language : the ultimate Creole phrase book : English-Creole dictionary. London: Nautilus Pub. Co., 1999.
 Strandquist, Rachel Eva.  Article Incorporation in Mauritian creole.  M.A. thesis, University of Victoria, 2005. 
 Wittmann, Henri. Les parlers créoles des Mascareignes: une orientation. Trois-Rivières: Travaux linguistiques de l'Université du Québec à Trois-Rivières 1, 1972. 
 Wittmann, Henri. « Lexical diffusion and the glottogenetics of creole French. » CreoList debate, parts I–VI, appendixes 1–9. The Linguist List, Eastern Michigan University & Wayne State University. 2001. 
 Wittmann, Henri & Robert Fournier. "L'agglutination nominale en français colonial." Revue québécoise de linguistique théorique et appliquée 2:2.185–209, 1981.  
 Wittmann, Henri & Robert Fournier. "Interprétation diachronique de la morphologie verbale du créole réunionnais". Revue québécoise de linguistique théorique et appliquée 6:2.137–50, 1987; in response to the hypothesis put forward by Corne (1982) in Baker and Corne (1982).

External links

 
Languages of Mauritius
French-based pidgins and creoles
Subject–verb–object languages